B.H. Fairchild (born 1942) is an American poet and former college professor. His most recent book is An Ordinary Life (W.W. Norton, 2023), and his poems have appeared in literary journals and magazines including The New Yorker, The Paris Review, The Southern Review, Poetry, TriQuarterly, The Hudson Review, Salmagundi, The Sewanee Review. His third poetry collection, The Art of the Lathe, winner of the 1997 Beatrice Hawley Award (Alice James Books, 1998), brought Fairchild's work to national prominence, garnering him a large number of awards and fellowships including the William Carlos Williams Award, Kingsley Tufts Poetry Award, California Book Award, Natalie Ornish Poetry Award, PEN Center USA West Poetry Award, National Book Award (finalist), Capricorn Poetry Award, and Rockefeller and Guggenheim fellowships. The book ultimately gave him international prominence, as The Waywiser Press in England published the U.K. edition of the book. The Los Angeles Times wrote that "The Art of the Lathe by B.H. Fairchild has become a contemporary classic—a passionate example of the plain style, so finely crafted and perfectly pitched...workhorse narratives suffused with tenderness and elegiac music."

Fairchild has written that a fellowship from the National Endowment for the Arts was vital to his career as a poet: "It's very simple: without an NEA Fellowship in 1989–90, I would not have been able to complete my second book, Local Knowledge, nor have had the necessary time to compose the core poems for The Art of the Lathe, my third book, which, I am proud to say, received the Kingsley Tufts Award and was a finalist for the National Book Award, thus bringing my work to a wider audience than the immediate members of my family and also, therefore, making future work possible."

He was born in Houston, Texas, and grew up in small towns in the oil fields of Oklahoma, Texas, and Kansas, later working through high school and college for his father, a lathe machinist. He taught English and Creative Writing at California State University, San Bernardino and Claremont Graduate University. He lives in Claremont, California with his wife, Patti, and dog, Minnie.  As of 2011, it has been announced that Fairchild will teach at The University of North Texas.

Books
Full-Length Poetry Collections
 An Ordinary Life (W. W. Norton, 2023)
 The Blue Buick: New and Selected Poems (W. W. Norton, 2014)
 Usher (W. W. Norton, 2009)
 Local Knowledge (W. W. Norton, 2005, second edition)
 Early Occult Memory Systems of the Lower Midwest (W. W. Norton, 2003)
 The Arrival of the Future (Alice James Books, 2000, second edition)
 The Art of the Lathe (Alice James Books, 1998)
 Local Knowledge (Quarterly Review of Literature, Princeton, NJ, 1991)
 The Arrival of the Future (illustrated by Ross Zirkle, Swallow's Tale Press, 1985; Livingston Publishing, 1985)

Chapbooks
 The System of Which the Body Is One Part (State Street Press, 1988)
 Flight (Devil's Millhopper Press, 1985)
 C & W Machine Works (Trilobite Press, 1983)

Special Editions
 Trilogy, with an introduction by Paul Mariani and engravings by Barry Moser.  (Pennyroyal Press, 2008)

Literary Criticism
 Such Holy Song: Music as Idea, Form, and Image in the Poetry of William Blake (Kent State University Press, 1980)

Honors and awards

2015 The Paterson Poetry Prize
2015 The Blue Buick, one of two books of poetry chosen for the RUSA/ALA Notable Books List
2014 John William Corrington Award for Literary Excellence from Centenary College
2014 Pushcart Prize in Poetry for "The Story"
2011 Pushcart Prize in the Essay for "Logophilia"
2010 Best of the Net Award for "The Student Assistant"
2009 Pushcart Prize in Poetry for "Frieda Pushnik"
2007 University of Kansas Distinguished Achievement Award
2005 Lannan Foundation Residency in Marfa, Texas
2005 Gold Medal in Poetry, California Book Awards
 2005 Aiken Taylor Award for Modern American Poetry
 2005 National Endowment for the Arts – Literature Fellowship in Poetry
 2004 Bobbitt National Prize for Poetry
 2002 Arthur Rense Prize, from the American Academy of Arts and Letters
 2002 National Book Critics Circle Award, for Early Occult Memory Systems of the Lower Midwest
 2001 The Frost Place poet in residence
 2000 Rockefeller Fellowship
 1999 Guggenheim Fellowship
 1999 William Carlos Williams Award
 1999 Kingsley Tufts Poetry Award
 1999 California Book Award
 1999 Natalie Ornish Poetry Award
 1999 PEN Center USA West Poetry Award
 1998 Finalist, National Book Award
 1997 Beatrice Hawley Award
 1996 Capricorn Poetry Award
 1988 National Endowment for the Arts – Literature Fellowship in Poetry
 Walter E. Dakin Fellowship to the Sewanee Writers Conference
 National Writers’ Union First Prize
 AWP Anniversary Award

References

Poets from California
English-language poets
Writers from Texas
Texas Christian University faculty
National Endowment for the Arts Fellows
1942 births
The New Yorker people
Living people